In baseball, the umpire is the person charged with officiating the game, including beginning and ending the game, enforcing the rules of the game and the grounds, making judgment calls on plays, and handling the disciplinary actions. The term is often shortened to the colloquial form ump. They are also sometimes addressed as blue at lower levels due to the common color of the uniform worn by umpires. In professional baseball, the term blue is seldom used by players or managers, who instead call the umpire by name. Although games were often officiated by a sole umpire in the formative years of the sport, since the turn of the 20th century, officiating has been commonly divided among several umpires, who form the umpiring crew.  The position is analogous to that of a referee in many other sports.

Duties and positions

In a game officiated by two or more umpires, the umpire in chief (usually the home plate umpire) is the umpire who is in charge of the entire game. This umpire calls balls and strikes, calls fair balls, foul balls short of first/third base, and makes most calls concerning the batter or concerning baserunners near home plate. To avoid injury, the home plate umpire wears similar equipment to the catcher, including mask, chest protector, leg guards and shoes with extra protection added over the laces. If another umpire leaves the infield to cover a potential play in foul ground or in the outfield, then the plate umpire may move to cover a potential play near second or third base. (The umpire-in-chief should not be confused with the crew chief, who is often a different umpire; see below.) In the event that an umpire is injured and only three remain, the second base position will generally be left vacant.

In nearly all levels of organized baseball, including the majors, an umpiring crew rotates so that each umpire in the crew works each position, including plate umpire, an equal number of games. In the earliest days of baseball, however, many senior umpires always worked the plate, with Hall of Fame umpire Bill Klem being the last umpire to do so. Klem did so for the first 16 years of his career. On the Major League level, an umpiring crew generally rotates positions clockwise each game. For example, the plate umpire in one game would umpire third base in the next.

Other umpires are called base umpires and are commonly stationed near the bases. (Field umpire is a less-common term.) When two umpires are used, the second umpire is simply the base umpire. This umpire will make most calls concerning runners on the bases and nearby plays, as well as in the middle of the outfield. When three umpires are used, the second umpire is called the first-base umpire and the third umpire is called the third-base umpire, even though they may move to different positions on the field as the play demands.  These two umpires also call checked swings, if asked by the plate umpire (often requested by catcher or defensive manager; however, only the plate umpire can authorize an appeal to the base umpire): the first base umpire for right-handed batters, and the third base umpire for left-handed batters; to indicate a checked swing, the umpire will make a "safe" gesture with his arms. To indicate a full swing, he will clench his fist.

When four umpires are used (as is the case for all regular season MLB games unless one has to leave due to injury), each umpire is named for the base at which he is stationed. Sometimes a league will provide six umpires; the extra two are stationed along the outfield foul lines and are called the left-field and right-field umpires (or simply outfield umpires).

Outfield umpires are used in major events, such as the Major League Baseball All-Star Game, and depending on the level, at parts of post-season playoffs. For Major League Baseball, all playoff levels use six umpires adding a left-field and right-field umpire, while at lower levels, six umpires are used at the championship games (such as NCAA). Rulings on catches of batted balls are usually made by the umpire closest to the play.

Crew chief
The term umpire-in-chief is not to be confused with the crew chief, who is usually the most experienced umpire in a crew. At the major-league and high minor-league (Class AAA and AA) levels, the crew chief acts as a liaison between the league office and the crew and has a supervisory role over other members of the crew.

For example, on the Major League level, "The Crew Chief shall coordinate and direct his crew's compliance with the Office of the Commissioner's rules and policies. Other Crew Chief responsibilities include: leading periodic discussions and reviews of situations, plays and rules with his crew; generally directing the work of the other umpires on the crew, with particular emphasis on uniformity in dealing with unique situations; assigning responsibilities for maintaining time limits during the game; ensuring the timely filing of all required crew reports for incidents such as ejections, brawls and protested games; and reporting to the Office of Commissioner any irregularity in field conditions at any ballpark." Thus, on the professional level, some of the duties assigned to the umpire-in-chief (the plate umpire) in the Official Baseball Rules have been reassigned to the crew chief, regardless of the crew chief's umpiring position during a specific game.  Instant replay reviews, for example, will be reviewed with the crew chief and one other umpire, with results announced by the crew chief.  The crew chief acts analogous to the crew chief in basketball (as referenced in the NBA and FIBA rules) or the referee in American football.

Starting with the 2022 season, umpire crew chiefs will be equipped with wireless microphones to be used when announcing replay challenges and the results of those challenges.

Judgment calls

An umpire's judgment call used to be final, unless the umpire making the call chose to ask his partner(s) for help and then decided to reverse it after the discussion. Since 2014, the MLB allows managers to challenge plays during the game. If the manager successfully has a call overturned, they are rewarded with another challenge. If an umpire seems to make an error in rule interpretation, his call, in some leagues, can be officially protested as is the case in MLB. If the umpire is persistent in his or her interpretation, the matter will be settled at a later time by a league official.  An independent study of umpire pitch-call accuracy over 11 seasons (2008–2018) released on April 8, 2019, by Mark T. Williams of Boston University concluded that over 20% of certain pitches were called incorrectly. For the 2018 season, home plate umpires made about 34,000 incorrect ball and strike calls, which is about 14 per game and 1.6 per inning.

In the early years of professional baseball, umpires were not engaged by the league but rather by agreement between the team captains. However, by the start of the modern era in 1901, this had become a league responsibility. There is now a unitary major league umpiring roster, although until the 1999 labor dispute that led to the decertification of the Major League Umpires Association, there were separate National and American League umpires. As a result of the 2000 collective bargaining agreement between Major League Baseball and the newly formed World Umpires Association (now known as the Major League Baseball Umpires Association) all umpires were placed on one roster and work in games in both leagues.

Amateur umpiring

An amateur umpire officiates non-professional or semi-professional baseball. Many amateur umpires are paid (typically on a per-game basis) and thus might be considered professionals, while some amateur umpires are unpaid. According to the Little League Baseball official website, umpires should be volunteers.

There are numerous organizations that test or train anyone interested in umpiring for local leagues, and can help make connections to the leagues in the area. Little League Baseball and the Babe Ruth League are two of the most popular organizations when it comes to youth baseball, and each have their own application, test, and training process for becoming an umpire. In Canada, most umpires are certified through a provincial organization, and then hired by local municipal associations through an umpire in chief.

For the Little League World Series, amateur umpires from around the world participate on a volunteer basis. Prospective Little League World Series umpires must participate at various levels of Little League All-Star tournaments, ranging from district to state to regional tournaments, prior to being accepted to work the World Series tournament.

High school umpiring
In the United States, many (if not most) high schools sponsor a baseball team.  Many high schools sponsor multiple baseball teams; for instance, "varsity" and "junior varsity" teams.  During the 2017–18 academic year there were 16,513 high schools sponsoring at least one baseball team, and 488,859 students participated on a high school baseball team.  Thus, high school baseball is one of the most popular levels of baseball in the United States.  Unlike college athletics, there is no competitive national championship on the high school level.  And, unlike college athletics, umpires on the high school level are not administered by a national organization (such as the NCAA).  Rather, high school baseball is administered at the state level (usually by a statewide high school athletic association) and the qualifications for becoming and remaining a high school umpire are usually set by the entity overseeing high school baseball in each individual state.  For example, the Florida High School Athletic Association sets forth minimum requirements for being a high school umpire in Florida.  Many statewide high school athletic associations contract with multiple local umpire associations throughout their state in which the local associations agree to train and provide umpires for high school games in each association's geographic area of the state in return for a "booking fee" being paid to the local associations by either the statewide high school association or by individual high schools.  The local associations also promise to train their umpires to meet the state high school association's minimum requirements for umpires.  For example, in Florida the Jacksonville Umpires Association trains and provides umpires for high school games in the Jacksonville area.

The specific requirements for becoming a high school umpire vary from state-to-state.  However, generally all states share the same basic minimum requirements.  First, a person trying to become an umpire must usually register with both the state high school athletic association and their local umpire association.  Upon registering, most states provide their umpires with a high school rulebook, casebook, and umpires' manual.  Second, most states require all umpires to attend clinics and meetings.  These clinics may focus on rules, umpire mechanics, or a combination of both.  Third, most states also require an umpire to pass a rules exam.  Finally, most states also require umpires to work a certain number of pre-season scrimmages prior to working regular season games.  As an example of these requirements, Georgia has an "officials accountability program" which sets forth the specific requirements for its interscholastic officials (including the attendance at clinics and camps and the passing of an examination) which can be reviewed here.

Although high school baseball is administered at the state level, the various state high school athletic associations have voluntarily formed the National Federation of State High School Associations.  Through the federation, most state athletic associations have agreed to use its rulebook.  Thus, while high school baseball is administered on a state level, almost all state associations use the same unique baseball rulebook (and the associated casebook and umpire manual) written specifically for the high school level. As a result, if an individual umpire moves from one state to another state (s)he would likely be using the same rule set in his/her new state as was used in his/her former state.  However, there are significant rule differences between the federation's rulebook compared to Major League Baseball (MLB) and NCAA rules. Thus, individuals wanting to umpire on the high school level will have to learn a different set of rules than those they may be familiar with had they previously umpired in a youth league using the MLB or NCAA rulebooks.

Almost exclusively, high school umpires are paid on a per game basis.  As they are not salaried, they are not paid if they do not actually umpire a game, although some states require the home school to pay the umpires' travel expenses if they show up to the game site and the game is called, regardless of whether or not it starts.  The amount paid differs, often significantly, from state to state.  Most high school games are officiated by a two-umpire crew.   However, many states use three-umpire and four-umpire crews to officiate playoff games.

Professional umpire training and career development
Becoming a Major League Baseball umpire requires rigorous training, and very few succeed. Provided the individual makes satisfactory progress throughout, it typically takes from 7–10 years to achieve MLB status. First, a person desiring to become a professional umpire must attend one of two umpiring schools authorized by Major League Baseball: Minor League Baseball Umpire Training Academy or The Harry Wendelstedt Umpire School.   The former is owned and operated by Minor League Baseball while the latter is run by former and current Major League and Minor League umpires.  Both are located in Florida. There are no prerequisites for attending these schools; however, there is an Umpire Camp, run by Major League Baseball, that is generally considered a "tool for success" at either of these schools. These camps, offered as two separate one-week sessions, are held in November in Southern California. Top students at these camps are eligible to earn scholarships to either of the professional umpire schools in Florida.

After five weeks of training, each school sends its top students to the Minor League Baseball Umpire Development (MiLBUD) evaluation course also held in Florida. Minor League Baseball Umpire Development, "is the entity which is responsible for the training, evaluation, and recommendation for promotion, retention, or release of all umpires in the Minor League Baseball system throughout the United States and Canada."  The actual number of students sent on to the evaluation course is determined by MiLBUD using input from the umpire schools. Generally, the top 10 to 20 percent of each school's graduating class will advance to the evaluation course. The evaluation course is conducted by MiLBUD staff, some of whom are also instructors at the Minor League Baseball Umpire Training Academy. The evaluation course generally lasts around 10 days. Depending on the number of available positions in the various minor leagues, some (but not all) of the evaluation course attendees will be assigned to a low level minor league. Out of approximately 300 original umpire school students, about 30-35 will ultimately be offered jobs in Minor League Baseball after the evaluation course.

Professional umpires begin their careers in one of the Rookie or Class "A" Short-Season leagues, with Class-A being divided into three levels (Short-Season, Long-Season and Advanced "A").  Top umpiring prospects will often begin their careers in a short-season "A" league (for example, the New York–Penn League), but most will begin in a rookie league (for example, the Gulf Coast League).  Since 2008, some umpires who attend the evaluation course, but are not offered jobs in professional baseball may be offered jobs in the Coastal Plain League (a summer wood bat league for collegiate players).  During the season, umpires in the Coastal Plain League are evaluated by MiLBUD and they may earn a promotion to a Rookie professional league as a result of injuries or resignations by umpires at higher levels.

Throughout the season, all minor league umpires in Rookie leagues, Class-A, and Class-AA are evaluated by members of the MiLBUD staff.  All umpires receive a detailed written evaluation of their performance after every season.  In addition, all umpires (except those in the rookie or Short Season Class-A leagues) receive written mid-season evaluations.

Generally, an umpire is regarded as making adequate progress "up the ranks" if he advances up one level of Class "A" ball each year (thus earning promotion to Class AA after three to four years) and promotion to Class AAA after two to three years on the Class AA level. However, this is a very rough estimate and other factors not discussed (such as the number of retirements at higher levels) may dramatically affect these estimates. For example, many umpires saw rapid advancement in 1999 due to the mass resignation of many Major League umpires as a collective bargaining ploy.

When promoted to the Class AAA level, an umpire's evaluation will also be conducted by the umpiring supervisory staff of Major League Baseball. In recent years, top AAA prospects, in addition to umpiring and being evaluated during the regular season (in either the International or Pacific Coast League), have been required to umpire in the Arizona Fall League where they receive extensive training and evaluation by Major League Baseball staff.  Additionally, top minor league prospects will also be sent to umpire in winter leagues (during Major League and Minor League baseball's off-season) usually located in the Caribbean, Central America or South America.

In addition, top AAA prospects may also be rewarded with umpiring only Major League preseason games during spring training (in lieu of Class AAA games). Additionally, the very top prospects may umpire Major League regular season games on a limited basis as "fill-in" umpires (where the Class AAA umpire replaces a sick, injured or vacationing Major League umpire).

Finally, upon the retirement (or firing) of a Major League umpire, a top Class AAA umpire will be promoted to Major League Baseball's permanent umpire staff. During this entire process, if an umpire is evaluated as no longer being a major-league prospect, he will be released, ending his professional career. In all, MiLBUD estimates that it will take an umpire seven to eight years of professional umpiring before he will be considered for a major league position.

, major league umpires earn $150,000 to $450,000 per year depending on their experience, with a $340 per diem for hotel and meals, plus first-class commercial airline tickets. Minor league umpires earn from $2,000 to $3,900 per month during the season. Amounts vary based on the umpire's classification and experience.

, there are 19 four-man crews in MLB, for a total of 76 full-time umpires; they are augmented by 16 Class AAA umpires eligible to umpire regular season games, yielding a total roster of 92 MLB umpires.

Uniforms
Umpires are often referred as "Blue" because of the traditional color of their uniforms. Standardized navy blue suits worn with white shorts and navy ties were adopted as umpire uniforms by the American Association, semi-formal and business-like attire elevated above the clothing worn by players. The National League adopted the same uniform the following year, as did the American League when it became a major league in 1901. Minor leagues likewise followed suit. For many decades there were no difference between the umpire uniforms of the two major leagues except that National League umpires adopted an inside chest protector worn under their suits while American League umpires wore an outside (or "balloon") protector over their suits when calling balls and strikes at home plate.

In 1968, American League umpires began to wear grey trousers with their blue coats, while National League umpires retained the solid blue suits. In 1970, the National League added a league logo patch to the chest pocket and the umpire's number on the right sleeve of the coat. That same year, the NL also introduced a short-sleeved light blue shirt worn without coat or tie for hot summer games; the American League also adopted the short sleeve variant in 1972. In 1973 the AL switched to a maroon blazer worn with blue pants, which was used until 1979. In 1975, the American League umpire hats added the abbreviation "AL". Beginning with the 1976 World Series, in cold weather umpires could replace the shirt and tie with a turtleneck sweater (originally light blue for the NL and beige for the AL). In 1977, the use of the outside (balloon) protector was outlawed for new umpires but grandfathered for existing umpires (the last umpire that used one, Jerry Neudecker, retired in 1985). The wearing of ties was phased out, with the 1979 All-Star Game being the last time they were worn.

In 1980, Major League Baseball standardized umpire uniforms for both leagues, adopting a uniform of a blue blazer, grey trousers, and short sleeved light blue shirt, with only the logo patch on the shirt and coat and the either "AL" or "NL" monogrammed caps differentiating them; the AL also added numbers to their umpire uniforms like the NL. Late in the decade, windbreaker-style jackets and heavier coats similar to those worn by players in the dugouts were adopted as alternatives to the blazer when weather appropriate.

In 1996, the button-down light blue shirt was replaced with a navy blue polo shirt with red and white trim on the collar and sleeve cuffs and red numbers on the sleeve. The simple monograms on the cap were replaced by a large red "N" with the NL logo and "A" with the AL logo respectively. The AL also permitted an optional red polo shirt (an homage to the 1973-79 red blazers) that was not widely used; the notable exceptions were Derryl Cousins and Dale Scott, who frequently wore the red shirts while working home plate, even as their colleagues on the bases wore the navy blue shirts. The NL added a light blue polo shirt for warm weather in 1997, which the AL adopted the following year. Beginning in 2000, after the individual leagues' umpires were consolidated into a single staff, the 1996-99 uniform styles were carried over with "MLB" on the caps instead of the league designations. 

In 2001 the uniforms switched to black polo shirts with grey slacks, with the hats and chest patches now bearing the MLB logo. The light blue shirt was replaced by a gray shirt, but the blue returned a year later. A long-sleeve version of the black polo is also available for colder weather, as is a short-sleeved turtleneck for use as an undershirt. Outerwear options consist of a black pullover windbreaker with removable lower sleeves and a heavier black dugout coat. Still available, though less commonly seen, is the plate coat, a modern version of the traditional blazer, also in black, which is typically only worn when serving as home plate umpire, where the large lower pockets are used for storing extra baseballs.

Famous umpires

Hall of Fame
The following ten umpires have been inducted into the National Baseball Hall of Fame:
 Class of 1953 – Tommy Connolly (NL, 1898–1900; AL, 1901–1931)
 Class of 1953 – Bill Klem (NL 1905–1941)
 Class of 1973 – Billy Evans (AL, 1906–1927)
 Class of 1974 – Jocko Conlan (NL 1941–1964)
 Class of 1976 – Cal Hubbard (AL, 1936–1951)
 Class of 1989 – Al Barlick (NL, 1940–1943, 1946–1955, 1958–1971)
 Class of 1992 – Bill McGowan (AL, 1925–1954)
 Class of 1999 – Nestor Chylak (AL, 1954–1978) 
 Class of 2010 – Doug Harvey (NL 1962–1992)
 Class of 2013 – Hank O'Day (NL, 1895, 1897–1911, 1913, 1915–1927)

Conlan and O'Day played in 128 and 232 major league games, respectively, prior to becoming professional umpires.

Several player inductees to the Hall of Fame served as substitute umpires for a small number of games during the early years of baseball; these include Hughie Jennings, Willie Keeler, King Kelly, and Chuck Klein.  Additionally, Hall of Fame player inductees Tim Keefe and Ed Walsh umpired professionally in the major leagues after their playing careers ended.

Numbers retired by the National and American Leagues

Like players, umpires are identified by numbers on their uniforms. National League umpires began wearing numbers in 1970 (though they were assigned numbers in the 1960s) and American League umpires were assigned and began wearing uniform numbers in 1980. The National League umpires' numbers were initially assigned in alphabetical order (Al Barlick wearing number 1, Ken Burkhart number 2, etc.) from 1970 to 1978, which meant that an umpire's number could change each year depending on retirements and other staff changes. In 1979, the National League changed the numbering system and thereafter an umpire's number did not change from year to year. At first, as new umpires, they would be assigned higher numbers (for example, in 1979, Dave Pallone, Steve Fields, Fred Brocklander, and Lanny Harris were assigned numbers 26 to 29 instead of available numbers between 1 and 25). The National League numbering practice changed again in the mid-1980s, when new umpires were assigned previously used numbers (for example, in 1982 Gerry Davis was assigned number 12, previously worn by Andy Olsen, and in 1985 Tom Hallion was assigned number 20, previously worn by Ed Vargo.)

The American League's number assignments were largely random. Bill Haller, the senior American League umpire in 1980, wore number 1 until his retirement following the 1982 World Series, but the number was never reassigned.

In 2000, the American League and National League umpiring staffs were merged into a unified staff under the auspices of Major League Baseball, and all numbers were made available, including the numbers that had been retired by one of the leagues. (For example, the American League had retired Lou DiMuro's number 16 after his death, but it was made available to his son Mike after the staffs were unified.) In the event of duplications, the more senior umpire was given the first choice. (For example, Al Clark in the AL and Jerry Layne in the NL both wore the number 24, but because Clark had more seniority he was assigned 24 and Layne number 26. When Clark was relieved of his duties in 2001, Layne was able to obtain number 24. By comparison, Bruce Froemming was given #6 upon unification of the umpiring staffs since he had worn it longer in the NL than Jim Joyce had worn it in the AL; Joyce subsequently chose #66, unused by any previous umpire. When Froemming retired following the 2007 season, Joyce opted to keep #66, and #6 is now worn by Mark Carlson.)

From time to time, Major League Baseball retires those numbers for umpires who have given outstanding service to the game, or in honor of umpires who have died.

Since unified umpiring crews were established in 2000, all numbers are available to Major League Baseball umpires, as each retired number was reserved per league. Only one umpire number has been retired since the current format was established, 42, because of the Major League Baseball policy instituted in 1997.
 1 Bill Klem (NL, 1905–41); currently worn by Bruce Dreckman
 2 Nick Bremigan (AL, 1974–89); currently worn by Dan Bellino
 2 Jocko Conlan (NL, 1941–64); worn by Jerry Crawford during his tenure in the NL (1977–1999)
 3 Al Barlick (NL, 1940–43, 1946–55, 1958–71); Last worn by Bill Welke and his brother Tim Welke
 9 Bill Kunkel (AL, 1968–84); also a National Basketball Association referee. Last worn by Brian Gorman.
 10 John McSherry (NL, 1971–1996); died at home plate during the Cincinnati Reds-Montreal Expos season opener. Currently worn by Phil Cuzzi.
 16 Lou DiMuro (AL, 1963–82); killed in an auto-related accident after a game in Arlington, Texas. Previously worn by his son, Mike DiMuro and currently worn by Lance Barrett.
 42 Jackie Robinson (retired by Major League Baseball since April 15, 1997.) Worn by Fieldin Culbreth in the American League through 1999; Culbreth switched to #25 when a unified umpiring staff was first used in 2000.

Longest major league careers

Most games
Regular-season major league games umpired

 5,460 – Joe West
 5,375 – Bill Klem
 5,163 – Bruce Froemming
 4,849 – Gerry Davis
 4,770 – Tommy Connolly
 4,673 – Doug Harvey

Most seasons
Careers beginning prior to 1920:
 37 – Bill Klem (NL, 1905–41)
 35 – Bob Emslie (AA, 1890; NL, 1891–1924)
 34 – Tommy Connolly (NL, 1898–1900; AL, 1901–31)
 30 – Hank O'Day (NL, 1895, 1897–1911, 1913, 1915–27)

 29 – Bill Dinneen (AL, 1909–37)
 29 – Cy Rigler (NL, 1906–22, 1924–35)
 25 – Brick Owens (NL, 1908, 1912–13; AL, 1916–37)
 25 – Ernie Quigley (NL, 1913–37)

Careers beginning from 1920 to 1960:
 30 – Bill McGowan (AL, 1925–54)
 28 – Al Barlick (NL, 1940–43, 1946–55, 1958–71)
 27 – Bill Summers (AL, 1933–59)
 26 – Tom Gorman (NL, 1951–76)
 25 – Nestor Chylak (AL, 1954–78)
 25 – Jim Honochick (AL, 1949–73)

Careers beginning since 1960:
 43 – Joe West (NL, 1976–99; MLB 2002–2021), recognized by MLB as having the longest tenure of any umpire in MLB history in terms of number of seasons umpired, and has umpired more games than any other MLB umpire
 40 – Gerry Davis (NL, 1982–1999, MLB 2000–2021), owner of officials equipment store; has umpired more postseason games than any other umpire (151)
 37 – Bruce Froemming (NL, 1971–99; MLB, 2000–07), ejected New York Yankees manager Billy Martin from Game 4 of the 1976 World Series, made controversial ball four call which prevented Milt Pappas' perfect game in 1972
 35 – Jerry Crawford (NL, 1976–99; MLB, 2000–2010), son of NL umpire Shag Crawford (1951–75) and brother of National Basketball Association official Joey Crawford (1977–2016)
 35 – Joe Brinkman (AL, 1972–99; MLB, 2000–06) last active umpire to have used the balloon chest protector (Brinkman switched to the inside protector in 1980); former owner of umpire school; last active AL umpire to work prior to implementation of DH.  Ejected Cleveland Indians manager Mike Hargrove from Game 2 of the 1998 American League Division Series after three pitches for arguing balls and strikes
 35 – Ed Montague (NL, 1974, 1976–99; MLB, 2000–09) One of three umpires (Bill Klem and Bill Summers were the others) to serve as World Series crew chief four times
 35 – Dana DeMuth (NL, 1985–99, MLB 2000–2019), made (with Jim Joyce) game-ending obstruction call in Game 3 of the 2013 World Series
 34 - Jerry Layne (NL, 1989–1999, MLB 2000–present) - as of 2023, MLB's most senior active umpire
 34 – John Hirschbeck (AL, 1983–99, MLB 2000–2016), brother of former umpire Mark Hirschbeck (NL 1987-1999, MLB 2000-2003), involved in infamous "spitting" incident with Roberto Alomar
 34 – Derryl Cousins (AL 1979–99; MLB 2000–2012) last remaining replacement called up during the 1979 umpire strike and last AL umpire to have worn the red blazer (1973–79)
 34 – Mike Reilly (AL, 1977–99, MLB 2000–2010)

 33 – Harry Wendelstedt (NL, 1966–98) The Wendelstedt family operates one of two MLB-approved umpire schools; son Hunter, currently an MLB umpire, took over after Harry's death in 2012.
 33 – Tim McClelland (AL, 1983–99, MLB 2000–2013), home plate umpire in Pine Tar Game and home plate umpire for David Wells' perfect game in 1998
 33 – Tim Welke (AL 1985–99, MLB 2000–2015), brother of former umpire Bill Welke (1999–2022), ejected Atlanta Braves manager Bobby Cox from Game 6 of the 1996 World Series
 31 – Dave Phillips (AL, 1971–1999; MLB, 2000–2002) He was the crew chief during the 1979 Disco Demolition Night at Comiskey Park, ordering the Chicago White Sox to forfeit the second game of a scheduled doubleheader to the visiting Detroit Tigers. First umpire to throw Gaylord Perry out of a game for an illegal pitch (1982), threw out Albert Belle for a corked bat (1994)
 31 – Larry Barnett (AL, 1968–99) Made "no interference" call in Game 3 of the 1975 World Series
 31 – Doug Harvey (NL, 1962–92), home plate umpire in Game 1 of 1988 World Series, punctuated by dramatic pinch-hit home run by an injured Kirk Gibson, nicknamed "God" for his knowledge of rules and ability to control games.
 31 - Tom Hallion (NL, 1985–1999, MLB 2006–2022), known for his "whirling dervish" strike-three mechanic, also had a viral discussion with New York Mets manager Terry Collins after ejecting pitcher Noah Syndergaard after a beanball incident in 2016.
 31 - Brian Gorman (NL 1991–1999, MLB 2000–2021), son of former umpire Tom Gorman (NL, 1951–1977)
 30 - Don Denkinger (AL, 1969–98), made infamous call in Game 6 of the 1985 World Series, then ejected St. Louis Cardinals manager Whitey Herzog and Cardinal pitcher Joaquín Andújar in Game 7. Also worked home plate in Game 7 of the 1991 World Series when the Minnesota Twins' Jack Morris pitched a 10-inning complete game in a 1–0 win vs. the Atlanta Braves. First American League umpire to switch from the outside chest protector to the inside protector in 1975.
 30 - Jim Joyce (AL, 1987–99; MLB, 2000–2016), umpire whose incorrect call led to Armando Galarraga's near-perfect game
 30 – Dale Scott (AL, 1987–1999, MLB 2000–2017); Last umpire to eject New York Yankees manager Billy Martin from a game, first openly homosexual umpire
 30 - Ángel Hernández (NL 1991–1999, MLB 2000–present)
 30 - Kerwin Danley (NL 1992–1999, MLB 2000–2021), first African-American crew chief in 2020
 30 - Larry Vanover (NL 1993-1999, MLB 2000-present)

Others

Other noteworthy umpires have included:
 Emmett Ashford (AL, 1966–70), first African-American umpire in Major League Baseball; retired after working 1970 World Series, when he became the first African-American to officiate a championship series or game in a major North American professional sport
 Ted Barrett (AL 1994-99, MLB 1999–2022), first umpire to work home plate for two perfect games (and was on the field for three perfect games), worked home plate in Game 3 of the 2018 World Series, the longest game by time and innings in World Series history and ejected Atlanta Braves manager Bobby Cox from a game in 2007, which broke the MLB record for career managerial ejections (132).
 Fred Brocklander (NL, 1979–92), replacement umpire called up during 1979 strike; called Game 6 of the 1986 National League Championship Series
 Jon Byrne (MLB 2014), the first Australian native to umpire a major league game in the modern era; Australian second baseman Joe Quinn was a substitute umpire for two National League games; one each in 1894 and 1896
 Amanda Clement (SD, 1904–10), first paid female umpire
 Ramon De Jesus (MLB, 2016–present), first major league umpire from the Dominican Republic
 Bill Dinneen (AL, 1909–37), called five no-hitters, and also pitched a no hitter (September 27, 1905); the only man to both pitch and call no-hit baseball games 
 Augie Donatelli (NL, 1950–73), made controversial "phantom tag" call in Game 2 of the 1973 World Series on the New York Mets' Bud Harrelson while sprawled on the ground at home plate in what was his final plate assignment
 Jim Evans (AL, 1971–99), ran one of only two official umpire schools until decertified after an incident in 2012
 Rich Garcia (AL, 1975–99), erroneously ruled 12-year old Jeffrey Maier did not commit fan interference on a fly ball by the Yankees' Derek Jeter during Game 1 of the 1996 American League Championship Series, allowing Jeter's game-tying home run to stand. New York defeated the Baltimore Orioles in five games, then won the Word Series vs. the Atlanta Braves.
 Bernice Gera (NAPBL, 1972), first female umpire in professional baseball
 Bill Haller (AL, 1963–82), brother of Major League catcher Tom Haller; last umpire to use outside chest protector in World Series (Game 2 in 1982)
 Sam Holbrook (NL 1996–99, MLB 2000–2022), made controversial Infield Fly Rule call in the 2012 National League Wild Card Playoff, ejected Washington Nationals manager Dave Martinez from Game 6 of the 2019 World Series, the most recent managerial ejection in World Series play and the first since 1996. Was behind the plate for Game 7 of the 2016 World Series, when the Chicago Cubs defeated the Cleveland Indians in 10 innings to win their first championship since 1908. 
 Eddie Hurley (AL, 1947–65), home plate umpire when 3-foot-7 Eddie Gaedel came to bat for the St. Louis Browns on August 19, 1951, and walked on four pitches. Also was home plate umpire for Game 7 of the 1965 World Series, when the Dodgers' Sandy Koufax shut out the Twins on two days' rest. 
 Bill Kunkel (AL, 1968–84) former major league pitcher and National Basketball Association official; son Jeff was a major league infielder
 Ron Luciano (AL, 1969–80) All-American lineman for Syracuse University football team in late 1950s; later was an analyst for Major League Baseball on NBC and wrote four books
 John McSherry (NL, 1971–96) died of a heart attack after seven pitches of 1996 season opener between Expos and Reds
 Jerry Neudecker (AL, 1966–85) last AL umpire to use outside chest protector after league disallowed its use by new umpires starting in 1977
 Jake O'Donnell (AL, 1968–71) also a National Basketball Association official from 1967 to 1995; only man to officiate both MLB and NBA all-star games. Worked the NBA Finals every year from 1972 through 1994. 

 Silk O'Loughlin (AL, 1902–18)
 Dave Pallone (NL, 1979–88) involved in 1988 shoving incident with then-Reds manager Pete Rose which led to Rose's 30-day suspension
 Steve Palermo (AL, 1977–91) career ended when he suffered spinal cord damage from a gunshot wound suffered on Dallas' Central Expressway while apprehending two armed robbers
 Babe Pinelli (NL, 1935–56) home plate umpire for Don Larsen's perfect game in Game 5 of the 1956 World Series
 Pam Postema first female umpire to work an MLB spring training game (1988), also worked the Hall of Fame Game in the same season
 Beans Reardon (NL, 1926–49) openly defied Bill Klem by using outside chest protector in NL
 Brian Runge (NL 1999, MLB 2000–12) first third-generation umpire following father Paul Runge (NL, 1974–97) and grandfather Ed Runge (AL, 1954–70)  Ejected Ichiro Suzuki from a game in 2009, the only ejection in Ichiro's professional career (1992-2019).
 Jack Sheridan (PL, 1890; NL, 1892, 1896–97; AL, 1901–14)
 Art Williams (NL, 1972–77), first African-American umpire in the National League, worked the 1975 National League Championship Series
 Charlie Williams (NL, 1978–99, MLB 2000-01), in 1993, became first African-American umpire to work home plate in a World Series game.  Ejected Steve Garvey from a game in 1986, the only ejection in Garvey's 19 year career (1969-1987).

Current MLB umpiring crews
Below are the umpire crews for the 2023 MLB season. Crews frequently change over the course of the year as umpires are injured or on vacation.

Etymology
According to the Middle English dictionary entry for noumpere, the predecessor of umpire came from the Old French nonper (from non, "not" and per, "equal"), meaning "one who is requested to act as arbiter of a dispute between two people", or that the arbiter is not paired with anyone in the dispute.

In Middle English, the earliest form of this shows up as noumper around 1350, and the earliest version without the n shows up as owmpere, a variant spelling in Middle English, circa 1440.

The n was lost after it was written (in 1426–1427) as a noounpier with the a being the indefinite article. The leading n became attached to the article, changing it to an Oumper around 1475; this sort of linguistic shift is called false splitting. Thus today one says "an umpire" instead of "a numpire".

The word was applied to the officials of many sports before baseball, including association football (where it has been superseded by referee) and cricket (which still uses it).

See also

 List of Major League Baseball umpires
 Referee

References

Further reading

External links

 Umpires at Baseball Almanac
 MLB Umpires. Major League Baseball
 World Umpires Association (labor union for major-league umpires)
 Association of Minor League Umpires
 Umpire's Role. Little League Baseball & Softball

Baseball occupations
 
Sports officiating